This is a list of records and statistics of the men's water polo tournament at the World Aquatics Championships since the inaugural official edition in 1973.

Confederation statistics

Best performances by tournament

All-time best performances
This is a summary of the best performances of each confederation at the World Aquatics Championships.

Legend
 * – Host team
 † – Defunct team

Team statistics

Debut of teams
Legend
 * – Host team
 † – Defunct team

Results of host teams and defending finalists
Legend
 † – Defunct team

Comprehensive team results by tournament

Finishes in the top four

Medal table

Champions

Team records
Teams having equal quantities in the tables below are ordered by the tournament the quantity was attained in (the teams that attained the quantity first are listed first). If the quantity was attained by more than one team in the same tournament, these teams are ordered alphabetically.

Tournament positions
 Most titles won 4,  (1978, 1994, 2011, 2019).
 Most finishes in the top two 10,  (1973, 1975, 1978, 1982, 1998, 2003, 2005, 2007, 2013, 2017).
 Most finishes in the top three 11,  (1973, 1975, 1978, 1982, 1991, 1998, 2003, 2005, 2007, 2013, 2017).
 Most finishes in the top four 13,  (1973, 1975, 1978, 1982, 1991, 1998, 2003, 2005, 2007, 2011, 2013, 2017, 2019).
 Most appearances 19,  (have participated in every tournament).

Consecutive
 Most consecutive medals 7,  (2007–2009–2011–2013–2015–2017–2019).
 Most consecutive golds 2,  (1998–2001);  (1986–1991).
 Most consecutive silvers 3,  (1975–1978–1982).
 Most consecutive bronzes 3,  (2009–2011–2013).
 Most consecutive finishes in the top four 9,  (2005–2007–2009–2011–2013–2015–2017–2019–2022).
 Most consecutive appearances 19,  (have participated in every tournament).

Gaps
 Longest gap between successive titles 30 years,  (1973–2003).
 Longest gap between successive appearances in the top two 16 years,  (1982–1998).
 Longest gap between successive appearances in the top three 10 years,  (2005–2015);  (2009–2019).
 Longest gap between successive appearances in the top four 18 years,  (1991–2009).
 Longest gap between successive appearances 26 years,  (1991–2017).

Host team
 Best finish by host team Champion:  (1994).

Other
 Most finishes in the top two without ever being champion 1,  (2013).
 Most finishes in the top three without ever being champion 3,  (2005, 2015, 2022).
 Most finishes in the top four without ever being champion 5,  (2003, 2005, 2015, 2017, 2022).
 Most finishes in the top four without ever being medaled 3,  (1986, 1991, 2009).

Player statistics

Multiple gold medalists

Multiple medalists

See also
 Water polo at the World Aquatics Championships
 List of World Aquatics Championships women's water polo tournament records and statistics
 List of world champions in men's water polo
 List of world champions in women's water polo
 List of World Aquatics Championships medalists in water polo
 List of men's Olympic water polo tournament records and statistics
 List of women's Olympic water polo tournament records and statistics
 FINA Water Polo World Rankings
 List of water polo world medalists
 Major achievements in water polo by nation

Notes

References

Sources

External links
FINA Water Polo website